Eleutheronema is a genus of marine ray-finned fish from the family Polynemidae, the threadfins. These fishes occur in the Indian Ocean and the western Pacific Ocean.

Species
The following species are classified within the genus Eleutheronema:

 Eleutheronema rhadinum (Jordan & Evermann, 1902) (East Asian fourfinger threadfin) 
 Eleutheronema tetradactylum (Shaw, 1804) (Fourfinger threadfin)
 Eleutheronema tridactylum (Bleeker, 1849) (Threefinger threadfin)

References

Polynemidae